I Think I'll Just Curl Up and Die! is a young adult novel by Rosie Rushton. It is the second book in her Leehampton series. It was first published in 1995 by Piccadilly Press.

Plot summary 
After the holidays, Chelsea, Jemma, Sumitha and Laura meet at Jemma's to talk about what they did over the summer. Chelsea tells them that she dated a boy called Juan in Spain, but that he was only interested in sex. Sumitha began dating Bilu Chakrabarti after she met him in Kolkata visiting her grandparents. Laura tells the girls that she could not stand spending time with Betsy on holidays and Jemma summarizes week she spent in Paris.

Jon cannot choose between Laura and Sumitha. He asks Sumitha out, but she declines because she is dating Bilu. Instead, Jon spends time with Laura. Jon's dad accepts that he will not study law, and respects his choice to become an artist. Jon is worried that his mother is being unfaithful because of her relationship with Vernon, a university friend. When he confronts Anona, she tells him that Vernon is gay.

Jemma meets Rupert Kentigan-Fry at a golf club and is surprised to learn that he likes her. They meet again at his sister's birthday party, but his friends ridicule her for attending a state school. Rupert takes her to the garden to dance, but Jemma feels insulted when he feels her up. Jemma plays Nancy in Oliver, and Rob Antell develops a crush on her.

Laura's mum is pregnant, and her boyfriend Melvyn wants to move in. Angry, Laura runs away to her father's house, but he and Betsy insist she returns home. Laura attempts to dye her hair black to attract Jon's attention, but the dye comes out wrong. Melvyn pays for a professional hairdresser to fix it, and Laura decides he is not as stupid as she thought.

Sumitha is in love with Bilu, but he is not always nice to her. He takes her to a party where she gets drunk and then his friend Giles drugs her drink. Bilu begins to drive her home, but leaves her alone at a gas station after she calls her parents. Sumitha breaks up with him, and her father apologises for pressuring her to date a Bengali boy.

Characters 
Chelsea Gee – Laura's best friend. Her mother is an agony aunt for teenagers and she writes articles for The Echo (a local newspaper). Chelsea is embarrassed by her mother, who has an unusual style. Chelsea is very pretty and wants to be a vet.
Laura Turnbull – Chelsea's best friend. She's got red hair and green eyes. Laura wants to be a writer. She hates Melvyn and Betsy, because she wants her parents to live together. She's in love with Jon.
Jemma Farrant – A new girl in Lee Hill. She was wearing jumpers with bears to school, because her mother said so. Now she's got fashionable clothes, but she can't make her mum stop calling her "petal".
Sumitha Banerji – A girl from India. Her family comes from Kolkata in West Bengal district. She was going out with Bilu, but now is in love with Jon (again).
Jonathan "Jon" Joseph – A talented student of Bellborough Court. He hates his school, because he likes drawing and painting (he's got talent for it) and in Bellborough Court he can't study art. He wants to go to Lee Hill, where he can study art. He's in love with Sumitha, but he also likes Laura.
Ginny Gee – Chelsea's mum. She's an agony aunt for teenagers and journalist for The Echo. 
Barry Gee – Chelsea's dad. He's unemployed. He likes to cook exotic food, which his daughter can't eat.
Ruth Turnbull – Laura's mum. She goes out with Melvyn. 
Peter Turnbull – Laura's dad. He lives with Betsy, his girlfriend.
Claire Farrant – Jemma's mum. She is not ready for Jemma to grow up, dressing her daughter in jumpers with little bears and calling her "petal" in public.
Andrew Farrant – Jemma's dad. 
Chitrita Banerji – Sumitha's mum. She teaches English to women from India.
Rajiv Banerji – Sumitha's dad. 
Sandeep Banerji – Sumitha's little brother.
Anona Joseph – Jon's mum. She studies art.
Henry Joseph – Jon's dad. He wants him to study in Cambridge.
Melvyn McCrouch – Ruth Turnbull's partner. 
Betsy – Peter Turnbull's partner. 
Rupert Kentigan-Fry – Jemma's temporary boyfriend.
Rob Antell – Chelsea's boyfriend. He dumps her before Christmas and starts to go out with Jemma.
Vernon – Anona's friend from university.
Bilu Chakrabarti – Sumitha's boyfriend.

British young adult novels
1995 British novels
Novels by Rosie Rushton